Choorakkottukavu Bhagavathy Temple is a Hindu temple situated in Thrissur City of Kerala, India. The temple is a participant in the Thrissur Pooram every year.

Gallery

References

External links

Hindu temples in Thrissur
Bhagavathi temples in Kerala
Thrissur Pooram